Stephen George Page  is an Australian choreographer, film director and former dancer. He is the current artistic director of the Bangarra Dance Theatre, an Indigenous Australian dance company. Page is descended from the Nunukul people and the Munaldjali of the Yugambeh people from southeast Queensland, Australia.

Early life and education
Stephen George Page was one of 12 children, raised in the Brisbane suburb of Mt Gravatt. His mother did not celebrate her Aboriginal identity until she met Page's father. He was educated at the Cavendish Road State High School, Brisbane.

He moved to Sydney when he was 16 and trained with the Aboriginal Islander Dance Theatre, which would later become the National Aboriginal Islander Skills Development Association (NAISDA). He graduated from NAISDA in 1983.

Career
Page first danced with the Sydney Dance Company.

In 1991, he was appointed creative director of the Bangarra Dance Theatre, with his brothers Russell and David joining around the same time.

He choreographed Mooggrah for Bangarra, Trackers of Oxyrhyncus for the Sydney Theatre Company, and a sextet for Opera Australia's Marriage of Figaro. During that time he also toured with the NAISDA associated Aboriginal Islander Dance Theatre.

With his works Praying Mantis Dreaming, Ninni and the 1994 production Ochres, co-choreographed with then assistant artistic director Bernadette Walong-Sene, Page established a milestone for Australian dance. In 1996 he made his creative debut with the Australian Ballet, choreographing Alchemy. The following year, he brought the Australian Ballet and Bangarra together in Rites, set to Igor Stravinsky's The Rite of Spring. The following year he choreographed Fish for Bangarra, with its world premiere taking place at the Edinburgh International Festival.

Page choreographed the flag handover ceremony for the 1996 Atlanta Olympic Games and co-directed segments of the opening and closing ceremonies of the 2000 Sydney Olympic Games. He also created the ceremony that opened the Olympic Arts Festival. He choreographed Skin, which premiered at the festival and won the coveted Helpmann Award for Best New Australian Work and Best Dance Work. His triple bill Corroboree toured internationally, with a sell-out tour of the US including appearances at the Brooklyn Academy of Music in New York and the Kennedy Centre in Washington. The work earned Page a Helpmann Award for Best Choreography. The following year, he was honoured with a Matilda Award for his contribution to the arts in Queensland. In the same year, he choreographed Totem for The Australian Ballet's principal dancer, Stephen Heathcote. 2002 also saw the world premiere of Bangarra's double bill, Walkabout, which Page co-choreographed with Frances Rings.

Page and Rings later co-choreographed Bush for Bangarra, which sold out on its Australian tour as well as its 2004 tour to the United States. Also in 2004, Bangarra returned to the Sydney Opera House with another sell-out production co-choreographed by Page and Rings, Clan. The following year Page choreographed Boomerang, which had a sell-out Australian tour.

As artistic director of the 2004 Adelaide Festival of the Arts, Page was praised for reinvigorating the event with an impressive and highly successful world-class program. His film and theatre credits include the contemporary operatic film Black River, numerous music video clips, and directing his own brother, David Page, in the one-man show Page 8 which toured the UK.

In 2006, Page and the Australian Ballet created Gathering, a double bill consisting of a reworked Rites and Amalgamate. Also in 2006, Queensland Art Gallery director asked him to create a new dance work for the opening of the Gallery of Modern Art. Along with his son and nephews, he created Kin, a special project that opened Asia Pacific Triennial of Contemporary Art.

In 2007, Page directed a traditional smoking ceremony in honour of the historic celebration marking the 75th anniversary of the Sydney Harbour Bridge. Later in the year, during Bangarra's True Stories season, he directed Victorian Opera's Orphée et Eurydice in Melbourne and presented another sell-out season of Kin at the Malthouse Theatre.

In 2008 he created a new, full-length work for Bangarra, entitled Mathinna, which won a Helpmann Award in 2009 for Best Dance Work and Best Choreography. He then took Rites to London and Paris with the Australian Ballet, and Bangarra's Awakenings to Washington, New York and Ottawa. Later in 2008, he went to Broome, Western Australia, as choreographer for the film adaptation of Bran Nue Dae.

In 2009, after returning from a tour of Germany, Hungary and Austria with True Stories, Page and the dancers spent 10 days in Arnhem Land on a cultural exchange. He celebrated Bangarra's 20th anniversary with Fire – A Retrospective, which won an Australian Dance Award for Outstanding Performance by a Company.

In early December 2021, Page announced that he would be stepping down from the role of artistic director of Bangarra in 2022, handing over to Frances Rings, current associate artistic director.

Bangarra's last performance with Page as director was Wudjang: Not the Past, which premiered at the Sydney Festival in January 2022 before touring to Hobart, and then Adelaide as part of the Adelaide Festival.

Film
In 2015 his directorial debut film, Spear, was shown at the 2015 Toronto International Film Festival.

Recognition and honours
His alma mater, Cavendish Road State High School, named one of its school houses "Page" in his honour. The house colour is purple.

In 2008, Page was named New South Wales Australian of the Year, receiving the award from Deputy Premier John Watkins at a ceremony at the Art Gallery of New South Wales.

In 2015, Page was awarded an Honorary Doctorate of Creative Arts by the University of Technology Sydney.

In 2016, the NAIDOC Lifetime Achievement Award went to Page for his work as Director of the Bangarra Dance Theatre.

From February to August 2016, Martin Portus (former Director of Marketing and Communication at the Australia Council for the Arts) conducted an interview with Page, who discussed significant periods in the history of the Bangarra Dance Theatre, beginning with the nature of his access to traditional cultures, especially in north-east Arnhem Land.

Awards and nominations
 1993: Mo Award for Dance Performance of the Year
 1993: Paris Opera Screen Award, Grand Prix for Black River
 2002: Matilda Award for Contribution to the Arts in Queensland
 2003: Sidney Myer Performing Arts Award
 2017: Australia Council Dance Award
 2022: Red Ochre Award
 2022: Inaugural Wendy Blacklock Industry Legend Award

Australian Dance Awards
The Australian Dance Awards recognise excellence and promote dance in Australia. They are awarded under the auspices of the Australian Dance Council (Ausdance) for performance, choreography, design, dance writing, teaching and related professions.
 (wins only)
! 
|-
| 1997
| Stephen Page (Artistic Director of Bangarra Dance Theatre)
| Outstanding achievement in choreography
| 
| 
|-
| 2010
| Stephen Page
| Services to Dance
| 
| 
|-

Deadly Awards
The Deadly Awards, (commonly known as The Deadlys), was an annual celebration of Australian Aboriginal and Torres Strait Islander achievement in music, sport, entertainment and community. They ran from 1996 to 2013.
 (wins only)
! 
|-
| Deadly Awards 2008
| Stephen Page and Bangarra Dance Theatre
| Outstanding Achievement in Entertainment
| 
| 
|-
| Deadly Awards 2009
| Stephen Page and Bangarra Dance Theatre]]
| Achievement in Theatre or Live Performance
| 
|
|-

Helpmann Awards
The Helpmann Awards are a series of awards celebrating live entertainment and performing arts in Australia, presented by industry group Live Performance Australia since 2001. Note: 2020 and 2021 were cancelled due to the COVID-19 pandemic.
 

! 
|-
| rowspan="2"| 2001
| rowspan="2"| Stephen Page for Skin (Bangarra Dance Theatre)
| Helpmann Award for Best Choreography in a Ballet or Dance Work
| 
| rowspan="2"| 
|-
| Helpmann Award for Best New Australian Work
| 
|-
| rowspan="2"| 2002
| rowspan="2"| Stephen Page for Corroboree (Bangarra Dance Theatre)
| Best Choreography in a Ballet or Dance Work
| 
| rowspan="2"|
|-
| Best New Australian Work
| 
|-
| rowspan="3"| 2003
| rowspan="2"| Stephen Page for Walkabout (Bangarra Dance Theatre)
| Best New Australian Work
| 
| rowspan="3"|
|-
| Helpmann Award for Best Original Score
| 
|-
| Stephen Page and Steven McTaggart "Rush" for Walkabout (Bangarra Dance Theatre)
|  Best Choreography in a Ballet or Dance Work
| 
|-
| rowspan="1"| 2004
| Stephen Page for Bush (Bangarra Dance Theatre)
|  Best Choreography in a Ballet or Dance Work
| 
| rowspan="1"|
|-
| rowspan="1"| 2009
| Stephen Page for Mathinna (Bangarra Dance Theatre)
| Best Choreography in a Dance or Physical Theatre Production
| 
| rowspan="1"| 
|-
| rowspan="1"| 2010
| Stephen Page for Fire (Bangarra Dance Theatre)
| Best Choreography in a Dance or Physical Theatre Production
| 
| rowspan="1"| 
|-
| rowspan="1"| 2012
| Stephen Page for ID from Belong (Bangarra Dance Theatre)
| Best Choreography in a Ballet or Dance Work
| 
| rowspan="1"| 
|-
| rowspan="1"| 2015
| Stephen Page for Patyegarang (Bangarra Dance Theatre)
| Best Choreography in a Dance or Physical Theatre Production
| 
| rowspan="1"| 
|-
| rowspan="2"| 2016
| Stephen Page, Bernadette Walong-Sene, Djakapurra Munyarryun for Ochres (Bangarra Dance Theatre)
| Best Choreography in a Dance or Physical Theatre Work
| 
| rowspan="2"| 
|-
| Stephen Page
| JC Williamson Award
| 
|-
| rowspan="1"| 2018
| Stephen Page for Bennelong (Bangarra Dance Theatre)
| Best New Australian Work
| 
| rowspan="1"| 
|}

=NAIDOC Awards
The NAIDOC Awards are annual Australian awards conferred on Australian Aboriginal and Torres Strait Islander individuals during the national celebration of the history, culture and achievements of Australian Aboriginal and Torres Strait Islander peoples known as NAIDOC Week. (The name is derived from National Aborigines and Islanders Day Observance Committee.)
 (wins only)
! 
|-
| 2012
| Stephen Page
| Artist of the Year
| 
| 
|-
| 2016
| Stephen Page
| Lifetime achievement award
| 
| 
|-

References

External links
Bangarra Dance Theatre

"Stephen Page interviewed by Martin Portus, 24 February 2016". Amplify - State Library of New South Wales Catalogue. Retrieved 4 June 2018.

Australian male dancers
Australian choreographers
Helpmann Award winners
Indigenous Australian filmmakers
1965 births
Living people
Officers of the Order of Australia
Indigenous Australian dancers